Lötter was the last name of a family of German printers, intimately connected with the Reformation.

The surname may also refer to:

 Melchior Lotter (born 15th century), German printer and founder of Lotter family
 Hieronymus Lotter (1497–1580), Renaissance builder and architect (see Augustusburg Hunting Lodge and Moritzbastei) who lived and died in Geyer, Germany, and former mayor of Leipzig, Germany
 Eberhardine Christiane Lotter (born Kinckelin), Adventurous traveler (see K.Beiergrosslein and J.Lotterer 2019) who traveled from Herrenberg (South Germany) to Charlestown on her own in 1786 and authored a diary of her travels.
 Tobias Conrad Lotter (circa 18th century), master engraver and son-in-law of German map publisher Matthäus Seutter
 Hans Lotter (1917–2008), highly decorated Oberleutnant in the Luftwaffe during World War II
 Marius Lotter (born 1963), founder of Gaswise the first computerized fuel pump management system running on the AT computer Marthinus J Lotter
 Shelley Lotter, co-founder of the Yale University Redhot & Blue (musical group) in 1977
 Markus Lotter (born 1970), German football coach and a former player
 Madelein Lotter (born 1971), former South Africa cricketer

 John Lotter (born 1971), American convicted murderer and character in the 1999 film Boys Don't Cry
 Bebe Lotter, fictional character played by Donna Mills in the 1972 television film Rolling Man
 Gert Lotter (born 1993), Namibian cricketer and rugby union player
 Albert Lotter, editor of Wrapped magazine
 Johann Lotter, violinist on the albums Victoria Day (2009) and The Waiting (2010)
 Sabina Lotter (1620–1676), wife of Johannes Koch von Gailenbach 
 Matthias Lötter (1696-1752), master Gold- and Silversmith at the Cape from Augsburg
 Tobias Conrad Lotter (1717-1777), was an engraver, cartographer and publisher in Augsburg. 
 Johannes Lötter, (born 1875) a Boer commandant in the Boer War

Other
 Lotter P.Edwin Edin, contestant on the Malaysian reality television show Akademi Fantasia
 Odd lotter, an investor who purchases shares or other securities in small or unusual quantities (lots)

See also

 Lot (disambiguation)
Lotten